David Boulanger (born 11 December 1974 in Rouen) is a French race walker.

Achievements

References

1974 births
Living people
French male racewalkers
Athletes (track and field) at the 2004 Summer Olympics
Olympic athletes of France
Sportspeople from Rouen